The designation B.I was used for two completely unrelated aircraft produced by Fokker:

 The Fokker M.7s flown by Austria-Hungary during World War I (named B.I by the Austro-Hungarian military)
 A biplane flying boat flown by the Dutch East Indies Naval Air Force in the 1920s (named B.I by Fokker)